Corfu (Kerkyra) is a major island in Greece.

Corfu, Kerkyra, Korkyra or Corcyra may also refer to:

Places 
 Corfu, a major island in Greece
 Corfu (city), the capital city of the island
 Corfu (regional unit), an administrative unit created in 2011
 Corfu Prefecture, a former administrative unit (1864–2010)
 Corfu Province, a former administrative unit (1864–2006)
 Corcyre, a former French department (1797–1799)
 Korkyra (polis), the ancient city which preceded Corfu
 Corfu, New York, a village in the United States
 Corfu, Washington, an unincorporated community
 Corfu Slide, a geological formation in the United States
 Corcyra Nigra or Korkyra Melaina, ancient name of Korčula island, in Croatia
 Korčula (town), on the island

Ecclesiastical sees 
 Metropolis of Corfu, Paxoi and the Diapontian Islands, an Eastern Orthodox see, part of the Church of Greece
 Roman Catholic Archdiocese of Corfu, Zakynthos, and Cephalonia

People 
 Korkyra (mythology), nymph associated with the island
 , Christian martyr of the 1st century, daughter of the Roman governor of Corfu
 Haim Corfu (1921–2015), Israeli politician
 Robert Corfou (born 1942), French football manager

Ships 
 Three warships of the Hellenic Navy have worn this name:
 , customs steamboat (1885–1897)
  (1943–1973), former BYMS-2172 minesweeper of the Royal Navy, sold to the Hellenic Navy in 1946
  (built 2004), Zubr-class LCAC
  (1931–1961), British ocean liner
 Corfu Diamond, ferry, name of MV Avrasya (1953–1997) during part of her life
  (1915–1956), Russian, Soviet & Bulgarian Fidonisy-class destroyer

Other 
 Corcyra (moth), a genus of snout moth

See also 
 Siege of Corfu (disambiguation)
 Corcyra (disambiguation)